Black Path is an ancient route between markets in London, England. It runs from  Walthamstow to Hackney, passing Broadway Market, Columbia Road and Smithfield.

The path is also known as the Templars’ Path and the Porters’ Way. The route is in use today for cycling and walking.

References

External links
 Black Path Walk Sheet from http://www.walthamforestwalks.info
  Black Path - the view from the bridge
 The Black Path By David Boote

Footpaths in London